

Quran 
The Quran is the central religious text of Islam, which Muslims believe to be a revelation from God. It is widely regarded as the finest work in classical Arabic literature. The Quran is divided into chapters (Arabic: سورة sūrah, plural سور sūwar), which are subdivided into verses (Arabic: آية āyāh, plural آيات āyāt).

 Text of the Quran

The text of the Qur'an of 114 chapters of varying lengths, each known as a surah. Each surah is formed from several verses, each called an ayah.

 Commentaries and exegesis (tafsīr)

A body of commentary and explication (tafsīr), aimed at “explaining” the meanings of the Quranic verses.

 Reasons of revelation (asbāb al-nuzūl)
The science which describes the reason, circumstances, and events surrounding the revelation of verses.

Previous revelations 
Other Islamic books considered to be revealed by God before the Quran, mentioned by name in the Quran are the Tawrat (Torah) revealed to the prophets and messengers amongst the Children of Israel, the Zabur (Psalms) revealed to Dawud (David) and the Injil (the Gospel) revealed to Isa (Jesus). The Quran also mentions God having revealed the Scrolls of Abraham and the Scrolls of Moses.

Sunnah 
Sunnah denotes the practice of the Islamic prophet Muhammad that he taught and practically instituted as a teacher of the sharī‘ah and the best exemplar. The sources of sunna are usually oral traditions found in collections of Hadith and Sīra (prophetic biography) as well as the Quran itself. Unlike the Qur'an, Muslims naturally differ on the set of texts or sources of sunnah, and they emphasize different collections of hadith based on to which school of thought or branch they belong.

Hadith (Traditions of the prophet) 

Hadīth are sayings, acts or tacit approvals ascribed and attributed to the Islamic prophet Muhammad.

Biographical evaluation (ilm ar-rijal)
The science which explores the narrators of hadith.

See also 

 Islamic holy books
 List of Sunni books
 List of Shia books
 Historiography of early Islam

References

 
Texts